BlueGrace Logistics is a third-party logistics provider (also known as 3PL) in the 2012 Inc. 5000. The company provides logistics technology, freight management, and customized transportation management to customers throughout the United States. BlueGrace is based in Riverview, Florida with satellite offices in Chicago, Chattanooga, Detroit, Phoenix, Richmond, San Diego, St. Paul, and Tulsa.

History 
BlueGrace Logistics was established in 2009 as a full-service 3PL by President and CEO Bobby Harris. The corporate office was initially located in Apollo Beach, Florida and was later moved to Riverview to accommodate its hyper-growth. In 2012, BlueGrace Logistics ranked as the #1 fastest growing company in the Transportation and Logistics Industry and the 20th fastest growing private company in the nation on the 2012 Inc. 500 List.

January 2010, BlueGrace launched an iPhone application for calculating shipping quotes from multiple carriers, becoming the first such company in the US to offer mobile capabilities to customers.

Franchise 
BlueGrace Logistics launched a franchise program in 2011, which led to 60 national franchises in 25 states across the US. In 2016,  BlueGrace bought back many of the franchises and they are now renamed as regional and branch locations.

References

External links 

Logistics companies of the United States
American companies established in 2009
2009 establishments in Florida
Companies based in Tampa, Florida
Transportation companies based in Florida
Transport companies established in 2009